United States gubernatorial elections were held on November 2, 2021, in two states, New Jersey and Virginia, and a recall election was held in California on September 14. These elections form part of the 2021 United States elections. The last gubernatorial elections for New Jersey and Virginia were in 2017, and the last regular gubernatorial election for California was in 2018. Going into the elections, all three seats were held by Democrats.

In Virginia, term-limited incumbent Ralph Northam was succeeded by Republican businessman Glenn Youngkin. In New Jersey, incumbent Phil Murphy won re-election. In California, an unsuccessful special election to recall incumbent Gavin Newsom was held on September 14, 2021. 

Despite failing to flip the state, Republican nominee Jack Ciattarelli had actually swung the state of New Jersey slightly more Republican from the 2020 presidential election than fellow Republican Glenn Youngkin did in the election in Virginia, where he managed to flip the seat. This was the first time since 1981, that every gubernatorial election in this cycle was won by single digits.

Election predictions

Several sites and individuals published predictions of competitive seats. These predictions looked at factors such as the strength of the incumbent (if the incumbent is running for re-election), the strength of the candidates, and the partisan leanings of the state (reflected in part by the state's Cook Partisan Voting Index rating). The predictions assigned ratings to each seat, with the rating indicating a party's predicted advantage in winning that seat.

Most election predictors use:
 "tossup": no advantage
 "tilt" (used by some predictors): advantage that is not quite as strong as "lean"
 "lean": slight advantage
 "likely": significant, but surmountable, advantage 
 "safe" or "solid": near-certain chance of victory

Race summary

Closest races 
States where the margin of victory was under 5%:
 Virginia, 1.94%
 New Jersey, 3.22%

Blue denotes states won by Democrats.
Red denotes states won by Republicans.

California (recall)

Governor Gavin Newsom was elected in 2018 with 61.9% of the vote. In 2020 and 2021, a recall petition gained momentum due to the COVID-19 pandemic in California and Newsom's responses, eventually triggering a recall election. The ballot featured two questions, whether to recall Newsom and who would have replaced him if he had been recalled. Newsom was ineligible to run as a candidate for the second question.

A large number of candidates announced their intention to replace Newsom. Among the most prominent Republicans in the race included 2018 Republican nominee John H. Cox, former San Diego mayor Kevin Faulconer, media personalities Caitlyn Jenner and Larry Elder, in addition to former U.S. representative Doug Ose.

The recall failed, and thus Newsom remained in office for the rest of his term, which expired on January 2, 2023.

New Jersey

Governor Phil Murphy was elected in 2017 with 56% of the vote. He ran for re-election to a second term and was unopposed in the Democratic primary.

Republican Jack Ciattarelli was the earliest to announce his candidacy for the governorship in February 2018. He was followed by New Jersey Republican Party chairman Doug Steinhardt, who announced his campaign in December 2020 and withdrew his candidacy the next month. Pastor Phil Rizzo and businessman Hirsh Singh ran for the nomination. Ciattarelli won the Republican primary.

The Libertarian Party announced activist Gregg Mele as their nominee in March. The Green Party nominated their candidate Madelyn Hoffman at a convention in April. Other minor candidates included Socialist Workers Party nominee Joanne Kuniansky and perennial candidate Ed Forchion of the Legalize Marijuana Party who ran as a write-in after challenges to signatures from the Murphy campaign.

Murphy won re-election after several media outlets called the race for him over Ciattarelli on November 3, 2021. Murphy's close election was surprising given he had the lead in every poll leading up to the election day. Moreover, Murphy trailed Ciattarelli from early voting at the start of the ballot count, taking the lead early Wednesday morning.

Virginia

Governor Ralph Northam was elected in 2017 with 53.9% of the vote. He was term-limited in 2021, as the Virginia Constitution does not allow governors to serve consecutive terms.

Lieutenant Governor Justin Fairfax, former governor of Virginia Terry McAuliffe, state senator Jennifer McClellan, state delegate Jennifer Carroll Foy, and state delegate Lee Carter announced their candidacies for the Democratic nomination for the governorship. Virginia attorney general Mark Herring previously announced his intention to run for the governorship but withdrew from the race to seek reelection as attorney general. McAuliffe won the Democratic primary by a wide margin despite the large field of candidates.

State senator Amanda Chase announced her candidacy for the Republican nomination for the governorship in February 2020. After initially indicating a brief attempt at an independent run because of the state Republicans' decision to hold a convention instead of a primary, Chase later returned to seek her party's nomination once more. Kirk Cox, the former Republican speaker of the Virginia House of Delegates, filed the paperwork to run for the governorship in September 2020. Businessman Glenn Youngkin won the Republican nomination after six rounds of voting at the convention.

Princess Blanding, a teacher and sister of the late Marcus-David Peters, was the newly-founded Liberation Party's gubernatorial candidate.

In the general election on November 2, Republican Glenn Youngkin defeated Democrat and former Governor Terry McAuliffe, making him the first Republican to win a statewide election in Virginia since 2009. Republicans also flipped the lieutenant governor, attorney general and House of Delegates races that were held concurrently.

Notes

References

 
November 2021 events in the United States